De Boma à Tshela is a Belgian 1926 documentary film.

Synopsis 
 explores the scenery along the railway line that links Boma to Tshela in the Mayumbe area. The train passes through the lush and dense vegetation of the thick forests and stops by farm estates along the route like Lukula, the Urselia domain (a colonial manufacturer of cocoa powder and palm oil), Lubuzi River and its new bridge, the Kangu mission and Tshela, where manufactured products are loaded onto boats for shipment to Europe. The train journey is also an eyewitness account of the workings of a well-oiled colonial system and the development of the black workforce at its service.

External links 

1926 films
1926 documentary films
Black-and-white documentary films
Belgian short documentary films
1926 short films
1920s short documentary films
Documentary films about rail transport
Documentary films about the Democratic Republic of the Congo
Belgian black-and-white films
Democratic Republic of the Congo short documentary films
Silent films